"Hearts Aren't Made to Break (They're Made to Love)" is a song written by Roger Murrah and Steve Dean, and recorded by American country music artist Lee Greenwood.  It was released in April 1986 as the third single from the album Streamline.  The song was Greenwood's sixth number one on the country chart.  The single went to number one for one week and spent a total of fourteen weeks on the country chart.

Chart performance

References

1986 singles
Lee Greenwood songs
Songs written by Roger Murrah
MCA Records singles
Song recordings produced by Jerry Crutchfield
1985 songs
Songs written by Steve Dean